Verteporfin (trade name Visudyne), a benzoporphyrin derivative, is a medication used as a photosensitizer for photodynamic therapy to eliminate the abnormal blood vessels in the eye associated with conditions such as the wet form of macular degeneration. Verteporfin accumulates in these abnormal blood vessels and, when stimulated by nonthermal red light with a wavelength of 689 nm in the presence of oxygen, produces highly reactive short-lived singlet oxygen and other reactive oxygen radicals, resulting in local damage to the endothelium and blockage of the vessels.

Verteporfin is also used off-label for the treatment of central serous retinopathy.

Administration
Verteporfin is usually injected intravenously into the largest arm vein. It is injected at a dose of 6 mg/m2 and light-activated. It is usually given 15 minutes before laser treatment. This dose can be repeated 4 times per year.

Contraindications
Porphyria.

Side effects
Most common side effects are blurred vision, headache, and local effects at the injection site. Also, photosensitivity; it is strictly advised to avoid exposure to sunlight and unscreened lighting until 48 hours after verteporfin administration.

Dogs and rats have been treated with inactivated daily doses 32–70 times higher than the dose advised for humans. The 4 weeks of treatment resulted in mild extravascular hemolysis and hematopoiesis in the animals.

Interactions 

Verteporfin is known to interact with the herbal remedy feverfew (Tanacetum parthenium), the latter of which seems to act as an antagonist to verteporfin for unknown reasons. Taking the two substances simultaneously is inadvisable.

Verteporfin does not appear to be metabolized by Cytochrome P450 enzymes, therefore not affecting Cytochrome P450 metabolism of other drugs.

Shortages
In May 2020, a low manufacturing capacity caused disruption. This affected the usage of verteporfin among providers and patients in Europe. The EMA expected normal manufacturing to return by the first quarter 2022.

Potential against scarring 
Verteporfin is FDA approved. Verteporfin is a YAP pathway inhibitor, interfering with its role in signaling following mechanic stress between cells and the extra-cellular matrix (Mechanotransduction). Verteporfin displays a wide spectrum of anti-fibrotic properties. Verteporfin prevents fibrosis in several human organs. Verteporfin was first noted as a drug that blocked cell proliferation in the liver. It is an inhibitor of fibrosis in patients with persistent cholestasis. Research has highlighted that verteporfin decreased expression of fibrotic genes in fibroblasts collected from nodules of patients suffering from Dupuytren's contracture. In 2018 information revealed verteporfin stopped fibrosis in the lung. 
Verteporfin is a marketed drug with a good safety profile. Physicians use verteporfin off-label. In 2018, physicians described the off-label usage for Peyronie's disease as an interesting step. 

In 2021, scientists tested verteporfin to reveal if the drug would prevent scar tissue in skin. The testing of verteporfin on humans cleft lips was due to occur in late 2021.

References

External links 
 

Photosensitizing agents
Ophthalmology drugs
Novartis brands